Gennadiy Vadymovych Natarov (born 23 January 1992) is a Ukrainian badminton player.

Career 
Natarov started playing badminton at badminton club in KPI, and made his international debut at Poland in 2006. In 2013, he competed at the Summer Universiade in Kazan, Russia. In 2014, he won Hatzor Israel International tournament in the men's and mixed doubles events, then became the runner-up of the Polish International tournament in the mixed doubles event.

Achievements

BWF International Challenge/Series 
Men's doubles

Mixed doubles

  BWF International Challenge tournament
  BWF International Series tournament
  BWF Future Series tournament

References

External links 
 

Living people
1992 births
Sportspeople from Kharkiv
Ukrainian male badminton players
Badminton players at the 2015 European Games
European Games competitors for Ukraine